Ronny Winkler (born 29 July 1971) is a German former competitive figure skater. He won two senior internationals, bronze at the 1989 Karl Schäfer Memorial and at the 1990 Nations Cup, and three national titles, East German in 1990 and German in 1993–94. At the European Championships, Winkler achieved his highest placement, tenth, in 1993 and 1994, and at the World Championships, 15th in 1993. His coaches were Jutta Müller, followed by Sonja Morgenstern. He retired from competition in 1996

Results

References
 German wiki article

1971 births
Living people
German male single skaters
Sportspeople from Chemnitz